Dongwan may refer to:

Dongguan, city in Guangzhou, southern China
Dongwan, Jingyuan County, town in Gansu, China
Dongwan, Qitai County, town in Xinjiang, China
Dongwan, Shawan County, town in Xinjiang, China
Dongwan, Wudian, a village in Wudian, Guangshui, Suizhou, Hubei, China

See also
Kim Dong Wan (born 1979), Korean singer